Rob & Gilly Bennett were a British husband/wife classical duo playing acoustic revisions of hymns and Christian worship songs since the 1980s.

Albums

British musical duos